St. Silas Abba (1322 – September 12, 1361) was an Italian Bishop, under call of the Roman Catholic Church in Ravenna, Italy. St. Silas, though his life was (for the most part) far from notable, was found dead in the bushes just below his chamber window. His continual efforts to avoid the executions of more than thirty-two sentenced thieves and murderers left him with the second name: St. Mercy.

References 

Archbishops of Ravenna
1361 deaths
Italian Friars Minor
14th-century Italian cardinals
1322 births